Magnetic Band was an Estonian metal-rock and jazz-rock band.

History
Magnetic Band was formed in 1976 by Gunnar Graps. They played jazz-rock, which had influences of reggae and funk-soul. Later, after Graps graduated from Tallinn music school (in 1977), Magnetic Band was reformed and started to play metal-rock as well. Magnetic Band soon became one of the most popular heavy-music bands in Soviet Union.

In 1980 Magnetic Band got first prize in the Tbilisi Rock Festival (1980). They performed a mixture of jazz-rock, blues and funk and was noted for their instrumental mastership.

In 1982, the Washington Post dedicated a whole page to Gunnar Graps and the Magnetic Band. In 1983, Magnetic Band got banned by Soviet authorities and was renamed to Gunnar Graps Group (GGG). GGG performed in Estonia and Soviet Union and was very popular until the end of decade.

They performed until 1989. In 1997, the GGG reunited, although they performed only about once a month.

External links
Magnetic Band's history (in Russian)
Magnetic Band at EstMusic.com

Estonian rock music groups
Musical groups established in 1976
Musical groups disestablished in 1983
1976 establishments in the Soviet Union
1976 establishments in Estonia